Tetrapus americanus is a species of fig wasp which is native to South and Central America.  It has an obligate mutualism with Ficus maxima, the fig species it pollinates.

References 

Agaonidae
Insects of South America